Scott Kinworthy (born 1974) is an American actor.  He was best known for his short-lived role as Josh Madden on All My Children from June 17, 2005, until September 15, 2005.

He has since had a small role in the 2003 film House of Sand and Fog, which starred Jennifer Connelly and Ben Kingsley. In 2005, he had a small role in the 2005 film Serenity. In 2008 he co-starred with Benny Ciaramello and Erica Shaffer in The Fall.

He also played Bruce Wayne in Nightwing: The Series on YouTube.

On the stage, he has appeared in the off-Broadway production of Blue Man Group in New York City and Las Vegas.

External links

American male soap opera actors
American male stage actors
American male film actors
1974 births
Living people